Sally Yeh (born 30 September 1961), sometimes credited as Sally Yip or Yip Sin-man, is a Hong Kong Cantopop diva and actress.

Early life
Born in Taipei, Taiwan, Yeh immigrated to Canada at the age of four with her family and grew up in Victoria, British Columbia. As a result of this, she has Canadian citizenship.

Career
Yeh's singing career started in the early 1980s and, shortly after, her acting career started as she sang songs specifically written for the movie soundtrack. She has released a total of thirty studio albums, plus compilations and live recordings.

Return to Taiwan
Yeh had a natural talent for singing and acting, but unfortunately due to the earlier decades of the 1970s and 1980s when Asians were not especially welcomed in the Canadian entertainment business, the area in which Yeh wanted to make her career, she decided to return to Taiwan to have a chance at stardom. In Taiwan, she worked hard to make improvements on her Chinese to stay in the Chinese entertainment business. However, because she was illiterate in Chinese, her managers had to create romanized or English phonetic versions to help her read the Mandarin Chinese song lyrics.

Move to Hong Kong
Later, she relocated to Hong Kong, which at the time was the primary center of Chinese entertainment, for a better chance at fame. Yeh learned to speak Hong Kong Cantonese.

Since then, Yeh has focused primarily on the Hong Kong Cantonese entertainment world. With the support of utilizing romanization to read Chinese characters in Mandarin and Cantonese in addition to her interactions within the Chinese entertainment business, she began to make improvements on both her spoken Mandarin and Cantonese, including reading Chinese characters. However, because she never had a formal Chinese education, her proficiency in reading Chinese is still limited on various levels and when she does have to read Chinese writing in certain situations without the support of romanizations, she is able to comprehend them to some extents, but will at times stumble upon Chinese words she is unable to read. When Yeh has to read Chinese lyrics, she still relies on Mandarin romanization and Cantonese romanization for support.

Yeh's proficiency to handwrite Chinese is even more limited and during a 1994 Jade Solid Gold Award event when she was participating in a word puzzle game to figure out the names of Chinese pop songs, she was able to figure out some of the song titles by reading limited Chinese characters that were already posted on the board as clues without the support of romanizations, though when it came to writing down the answers on the board, she wrote in English phonetics to reflect the Cantonese pronunciations of the Chinese song titles as she admitted it was a lot more quicker to write than taking time to figure out the complicated Chinese character hand strokes. In the 1993 Jade Solid Gold Award event, several Hong Kong female artists including Sally Yeh that were in the line up for the best female artist award were pulling out tennis balls of their Chinese names written down, which they had to out loudly announce once pulling it out and Sally had pulled out a tennis ball two times, in one of the balls she was able to read out Faye Wong's Chinese name, but struggled to announce Vivian Chow's Chinese name on the other ball, which Carol Cheng and Sandy Lam stepped in to help her read it out; Lawrence Cheng who was one of the hosts for the show even commented for the future to maybe have both the English and Chinese names of the artists written down.   In a July 2022 English conducted interview with Liu Xin on CGTN's news report program The Point, Sally admitted that when listening to news programs in Chinese, she is okay with understanding the contents, however over the years of her career singing Chinese songs, very often she is not able to fully understand the lyrics she is singing and very often has to listen into the arrangements of the music surrounding the songs to be able to sing out the emotions to appropriately relate to the songs.  In a Canadian interview back in the late 1990s, which was all conducted in English, Sally was being interviewed about her career and briefly of her childhood and youth years and somewhere along the interview, Sally even commenting on her English skills getting bad even though this is her most fluent language skill implying she has been in the Chinese speaking entertainment world for such a long time mainly using Chinese that it has started to affect her English skills. 

Yeh has received the Most Popular Hong Kong Female Singer award at the Jade Solid Gold Best Ten Music Awards four times (1990, 1991, 1992, and 1993). In 1992, Sally Yeh collaborated with a couple of other western artists, recording "I'm Always Dreaming of You" with Tommy Page in 1992 and "I Believe in Love" with James Ingram the following year.

In 2002, Yeh re-entered the Cantopop market, released the record "Can You Hear", and performed a series of concerts in different countries. In 2011, Sally Yeh received the Golden Needle Award at the 33rd RTHK Top Ten Chinese Gold Song Music Award Ceremony. Yeh has also collaborated on a number of soundtracks (mostly on Tsui Hark's movies with scores by Wong Jim), including "Lai Ming But Yiu Loi" from A Chinese Ghost Story (1987), which won the Best Original Song award at the 7th Hong Kong Film Awards.

Image and artistry
Sally Yeh was one of the earliest Overseas Chinese celebrities to enter the entertainment industry in China during the 1980s and one of the few from an English-speaking country. She was also one of the earliest Mandarin speaking celebrities to enter the Hong Kong entertainment industry. In doing so, she paved a way for future divas such as Faye Wong, whom she collaborated with occasionally in her prime.

Personal life
On 17 July 1996, Yeh married Hong Kong pop star and composer-producer George Lam. 

Yeh speaks English, Mandarin, and Cantonese in that order of proficiency.

Discography

Filmography
Honest Little Ma 一根火柴 (1980)
Marianna 賓妹 (a.k.a. 你要活著回去) (1982)
Crimson Street 殺人愛情街 (1982)
Golden Queen Commando (a.k.a. Amazon Commando / Jackie Chan's Crime Force / Sexy Commando) 紅粉兵團 (1982)
Pink Force Commando (Sequel to Golden Queens Commando) 紅粉游俠 (a.k.a. 烈血長天) (1982)
A Flower in the Storm (a.k.a. Falling in the Rain Flowers) 飄零雨中花 (1983)
A Certain Romance 少女日記 (1984)
Funny Face (cameo) 醜小鴨 (1984)
Shanghai Blues 上海之夜 (1984)
The Occupant (a.k.a. The Tenant) 靈氣迫人 (1984)
Teppanyaki (a.k.a. New Mr. Boo, Teppanyaki / Mr. Boo 6) 鐵板燒 (1984)
Seven Foxes X陷阱 (1984)
Mob Busters 惡漢笑擊隊 (a.k.a.情報販子) (1985)
Cupid One 愛神一號 (1985)
Just For Fun 空心少爺 (1985)
The Protector 威龍猛探 (1985) (Hong Kong version)
Welcome 補鑊英雄 (1985)
Aces Go Places 4 (a.k.a. Mad Mission IV / You Never Die Twice) 最佳拍擋IV之千里救差婆 (1986)
Peking Opera Blues 刀馬旦 (1986)
The Laser Man (1988)
The Diary of a Big Man (1988) 大丈夫日記 (1988)
I Love Maria (a.k.a. RoboForce) 鐵甲無敵瑪利亞 (1988)
The Killer 喋血雙雄 (1989)
Swordsman (Uncredited / She had to leave this troubled production before filming completed, but a couple shots of her remain in the film, her role was filled by Sharla Cheung Man) 笑傲江湖 (1990)
The Banquet (cameo) 豪門夜宴 (1991)
Sisters of the World Unite 莎莎嘉嘉站起來 (1991)
Love Under the Sun (2003)

See also

 Cantopop
 Cinema of Hong Kong

References

External links
 
 Sally Yeh: The Effervescent Queen of Pop
 Sally Yeh's Facebook
 Sally Yeh's Weibo
 ILove-Sally.com

1961 births
Living people
Actresses from Taipei
Actresses from Victoria, British Columbia
Canadian musicians of Taiwanese descent
Canadian emigrants to Hong Kong
Cantopop singers
Hong Kong film actresses
20th-century Hong Kong women singers
Hong Kong people of Taiwanese descent
Hong Kong Mandopop singers
Hong Kong television actresses
Musicians from Taipei
Musicians from Victoria, British Columbia
Taiwanese emigrants to Canada
Taiwanese women singers
Taiwanese film actresses
20th-century Hong Kong actresses
21st-century Hong Kong actresses
Hong Kong Buddhists
Taiwanese Buddhists
21st-century Hong Kong women singers
Taiwanese-born Hong Kong artists